Kaminski Nunatak is a cone-shaped nunatak  southeast of the Rivas Peaks in the Neptune Range, Pensacola Mountains, Antarctica. It was mapped by the United States Geological Survey from surveys and U.S. Navy air photos, 1956–66, and was named by the Advisory Committee on Antarctic Names for Francis Kaminski, an aerographer at Ellsworth Station, winter 1958.

References

Nunataks of Queen Elizabeth Land